Justin Ives (born 24 May 1984) is a New Zealand-born Japanese rugby union player. He was named in Japan's squad for the 2015 Rugby World Cup.

References

1984 births
Living people
Japanese rugby union players
New Zealand rugby union players
Japan international rugby union players
Otago rugby union players
Saitama Wild Knights players
Yokohama Canon Eagles players
Kubota Spears Funabashi Tokyo Bay players
Rugby union locks
Rugby union flankers
New Zealand emigrants to Japan